The United States Coast Guard Ceremonial Honor Guard is a unit of the United States Coast Guard responsible for the performance of public duties. Stationed at the Command, Control, Communication, Computer, Cyber and Intelligence Service Center (C5ISC) in Alexandria, Virginia, the unit was activated in 1962.

History
The U.S. Coast Guard Ceremonial Honor Guard was activated on March 5, 1962 to support Coast Guard ceremonial missions and provide a Coast Guard presence during state occasions, such as the presidential inaugural parade and state and official arrival ceremonies. Prior to this, ad hoc units raised from the Coast Guard Recruit Training Center in Cape May, New Jersey performed these functions. Initially stationed in Baltimore, Maryland, the Coast Guard Ceremonial Honor Guard was redeployed to its current station at the Command, Control, Communication, Computer, Cyber and Intelligence Service Center (C5ISC) in Alexandria, Virginia as of 1965.

Organization

Mission
The U.S. Coast Guard Ceremonial Honor Guard provides – along with similar units from the U.S. Army, U.S. Navy, U.S. Marine Corps, and U.S. Air Force –  marching platoons for state and official arrival ceremonies at the White House and the Pentagon, for the quadrennial presidential inaugural parade, for annual Independence Day observances in Washington, D.C., as well as for public events (recently including New Orleans Mardi Gras and the Coast Guard Festival in Grand Haven, Michigan). It also provides elements for military tattoos, change of command ceremonies, ship commissioning ceremonies, and its personnel serve as pallbearers, color guards, and firing parties at the funerals of Coast Guardsmen at Arlington National Cemetery.

According to the Coast Guard, most personnel assigned to the U.S. Coast Guard Ceremonial Honor Guard serve a two-year tour of duty with the unit and are selected directly from recruit training.

Uniforms
The unit wears the Coast Guard "full dress blue" uniform augmented with the service identification badge, white belt with embossed brass buckle, white aiguillette, and white gloves.

Notable members
 Perry Ellis (fashion designer)

See also

 U.S. Coast Guard Band
 U.S. Coast Guard Pipe Band

References

Units and organizations of the United States Coast Guard
Organizations established in 1962
Ceremonial units of the United States military